Nossa Senhora do Rosário is a freguesia (civil parish) of Cape Verde. It covers the larger eastern part of the municipality of Ribeira Brava, on the island of São Nicolau.

Subdivisions
The freguesia consists of the following settlements (population at the 2010 census):

 Água das Patas (pop: 108)
 Belém (pop: 132)
 Boqueirão (pop: 15)
 Cachaço (pop: 393)
 Caleijão (pop: 300)
 Campinho (pop: 266)
 Canto Fajã (pop: 238)
 Carriçal (pop: 190)
 Carvoeiros (pop 199)
 Chã de Norte (pop: 17)
 Figueira de Cocho (pop: 1)
 Juncalinho (pop: 433, town)
 Lompelado (pop: 416)
 Morro (pop: 146)
 Morro Brás (pop: 188)
 Pico Agudo (pop: 118)
 Pombas (pop: 125)
 Preguiça (pop: 567)
 Ribeira Brava (pop: 1,936, city)
 Talho (pop: 308)

References

Ribeira Brava, Cape Verde
Parishes of Cape Verde